Federal Road may refer to:

Federal Road (Cherokee lands) from Athens, Georgia to Chattanooga and Knoxville, Tennessee
Federal Road (Creek lands) from Fort Wilkinson (close to Milledgeville, Georgia) to Fort Stoddert (close to Mobile, Alabama)
List of United States federally maintained roads
Malaysian Federal Roads System